The Tianjin Health Industry Park is a professional tennis tournament played on outdoor hardcourts. It is currently part of the ITF Women's Circuit. It was previously part of the ATP Challenger Tour in 2014. It has been held annually in Tianjin, China since 2014.

Past finals

Men's singles

Women's singles

Men's doubles

Women's doubles

External links

 
ITF Women's World Tennis Tour
ATP Challenger Tour
Tennis tournaments in China
Hard court tennis tournaments
Recurring sporting events established in 2014